Camp Edwards is a former United States Army installation in South Korea home to the 82nd Engineer Company, C Company 702nd Maintenance Battalion, D Company, 2nd Medical Battalion, 2nd S&T Detachment and the 618th Medical Battalion (Dental). Named after Medal of Honor recipient Junior D. Edwards, the camp was closed in 2004 and its equipment was moved to Camp Casey. Following its closure, the land was purchased by Ewha Womans University.

Location 

East compound: 

 Yeongtae-ri (영태리) in the Wollong-myeon sub-administrative district of Paju-si, Gyeonggi-do.

External links

Notes

References

Closed installations of the United States Army
Edwards, Camp